Birth of the Muses is a 1944–1950 bronze sculpture by Jacques Lipchitz, installed on the Massachusetts Institute of Technology (MIT) campus, in Cambridge, Massachusetts, United States.

See also
 Muses in popular culture

References

External links

 Birth of the Muses, 1944 at cultureNOW

Bronze sculptures in Massachusetts
Massachusetts Institute of Technology campus
Outdoor sculptures in Cambridge, Massachusetts
Sculpture by Jacques Lipchitz
Statues in Massachusetts
Greek Muses